

Dinosaurs

Anapsids

Newly named anapsids

Plesiosaurs

Newly named plesiosaurs

Pterosaurs

New taxa

Synapsids

Non-mammalian

See also

References

1870s in paleontology
Paleontology